The Aviadvigatel PS-90 is a Russian high-bypass commercial turbofan rated at 16000 kgf (157 kN, 35,300 lbf) thrust. It powers Russian airliners such as the Ilyushin Il-96 and the Tupolev Tu-204/Tu-214 series and transport aircraft such as the Ilyushin Il-76. It is made by the Russian aircraft engine company Aviadvigatel, which is the successor of the Soviet Soloviev Design Bureau. "PS" are the initials of Pavel Soloviev.

Design and development
With the advent of new generation of Russian airliners, Aviadvigatel developed the PS-90 to satisfy the demands of economy, performance and exhaust emissions. It represented a huge advance over previous generations of 1960s era Soviet engines. The PS-90 is almost double the efficiency of those engines and is reasonably competitive to western engines of the 1980s such as the Pratt & Whitney PW2000.

Design features
It incorporates many firsts in a one-of-a-kind Russian engine with advanced technology features such as
 High-bypass turbofan design for economy
 Integrated exhaust with exhaust mixer for good efficiency
 Acoustically treated exhaust duct for low noise
 Full-authority digital engine control (FADEC)
 Long service life based on on-condition maintenance
 Modular design for ease of maintenance

It was first certified in 1992 and has been in service since.

Variants

There are several variants: the basic PS-90A, the PS-90A-76, and the improved PS-90A versions. The latter include the PS-90A1, PS-90A2, PS-90A-42 and the PS-90A3 engines.

PS-90A

The PS-90A engine is the initial variant and is standard equipment for Ilyushin Il-96-300, Tupolev Tu-204-100 and Tupolev Tu-214. For the first time it allowed Russian airliners to achieve similar performance and economy to their western counterparts. PS-90A is rated nominally at 16000 kgf (157 kN, 35,300 lbf) thrust, 13.3% less than the Rolls-Royce RB211-535E4 engine (which is also offered on the Tu-204), and the fuel consumption is 8.2% less than it.

PS-90A-76
This variant is a modification of the basic PS-90A engine. It is rated nominally up to  14,500 kgf (142 kN, 32,000 lbf) take-off thrust.

By replacing the D-30KP on the older Il-76, the service life of the aircraft can be extended. Fuel efficiency, and performance will be markedly improved and noise pollution reduced to the comply with the new strict requirements.  With the large fleet of both civil and military Il-76 aircraft still in operation, a potentially large market exists for engine replacement. An example of such a modified version is the Il-76MD-90. The PS-90A-76 is the standard on the newly built, modernized versions of the Il-76, such as the Il-76MD-90A and the Il-76MF.

PS-90A1
This variant is also a modification of the basic PS-90A engine. It was certified in 2007 and is offered as an option on the IL-96-400T aircraft.

PS-90A2
The PS-90A2 is an advanced derivative of the PS-90A, developed in cooperation with Pratt & Whitney. It has a fair proportion of western components from France, Germany, Sweden and the USA. It is also lighter than PS-90A and features improved FADEC. These features improve the performance and reduce maintenance costs by 40%. Fuel consumption is on par with current western engines, and its noise levels are below the current regulatory requirements. The PS-90A2 is the first Russian engine to be ETOPS-180 min rated. It is offered in newly built aircraft and is completely interchangeable with the PS-90A, allowing simple upgrades on present airliners.

It has the same thrust rating as the PS-90A, 16000 kgf (157 kN, 35,300 lbf) thrust. It is also capable of 18000 kgf (176 kN, 39,600 lbf) thrust.

Future American involvement in engine development has been put in doubt after attempts to block sale of PS-90A2 engines to an Iranian customer.

PS-90A-42
This is a version of the PS-90A2 intended for the Beriev A-42 search and rescue aircraft.

PS-90A3
According to the manufacturer, it is a modification of the PS-90A2. It was certified in January 2011 and intended to power the Tupolev Tu-204SM aircraft. It is unclear whether the US and Western European components of the PS-90A2 remain or whether they have been replaced by Russian ones. If the US components have indeed been replaced, then this engine could be fitted to the Tu-204SM ordered by Iran Air and its subsidiaries.

Gas Turbines
 GTE-25P, GTU-25P unit
 Gas turbine PS-90GP-2 derivative of PS90A2

Specifications (PS-90A1)

See also

References

External links

Manufacturer specifications
PS-90 production list (in Russian)

PS-90
High-bypass turbofan engines
1990s turbofan engines